Thalassa (Attic Greek: , Thálatta) was the general word for 'sea' and for its divine female personification in Greek mythology. The word may have been of Pre-Greek origin.

Mythology 
According to a scholion on Apollonius of Rhodes, the fifth-century BC poet Ion of Chios had Thalassa as the mother of Aegaeon (Briareus, one of the Hecatoncheires). Diodorus Siculus ( 1st century BC), in his Bibliotheca historica, states that "Thalatta" is the mother of the Telchines and the sea-nymph Halia, while in the Orphic Hymn to the Sea, Tethys, who is here equated with Thalassa, is called the mother of Kypris (Aphrodite). 

The Roman mythographer Hyginus (c. 64 BC – AD 17), in the preface to his Fabulae, calls "Mare" (Sea) the daughter of Aether and Dies (Day), and thus the sister of Terra (Earth) and Caelus (Sky). With her male counterpart Pontus, she spawns the species of fish.

Literature 

Two rather similar fables are recorded by Babrius. In one, numbered 168 in the Perry Index, a farmer witnesses a shipwreck and reproaches the sea for being “an enemy of mankind”. Assuming the form of a woman, she answers by blaming the winds for her turbulence. Otherwise, “I am gentler than that dry land of yours.” In the other, a survivor from a shipwreck accuses the sea of treachery and receives the same excuse. But for the winds, “by nature I am as calm and safe as the land.”

In yet another fable, Perry’s number 412 and only recorded by Syntipas, the rivers complain to the sea that their sweet water is turned undrinkably salty by contact with her. The sea replies that if they know as much, they should avoid such contact. The commentary suggests that the tale may be applied to people who criticize someone inappropriately even though they may actually be helping them.

In the 2nd century CE, Lucian represented Thalassa in a comic dialogue with Xanthus, the god of the River Scamander, who had been attacked by a rival Greek deity for complaining that his course was being choked with dead bodies during the Trojan War. In this case he had been badly scorched and asks her to soothe his wounds.

Art 

While the sea-divinities Tethys and Oceanus were formerly represented in Roman-era mosaics, they were replaced at a later period by the figure of Thalassa, especially in Western Asia. There she was depicted as a woman clothed in bands of seaweed and half submerged in the sea, with the crab-claw horns that were formerly an attribute of Oceanus now transferred to her head. In one hand she holds a ship's oar, and in the other a dolphin.
 
In 2011, Swoon created a site-specific installation depicting the goddess in the atrium of the New Orleans Museum of Art. In fall 2016, the installation was erected once more in the atrium of the Detroit Institute of Arts.

Notes

References 
 Athanassakis, Apostolos N., and Benjamin M. Wolkow, The Orphic Hymns, Johns Hopkins University Press, 2013. .
 Babrius, Phaedrus, Fables. Translated by Ben Edwin Perry. Loeb Classical Library No. 436. Cambridge, Massachusetts, Harvard University Press, 1965. Online version at Harvard University Press.
 Beekes, Robert S. P., Etymological Dictionary of Greek, 2 vols, Leiden, Brill, 2009. . Online version at Brill.
 Campbell, David A., Greek Lyric, Volume IV: Bacchylides, Corinna, Loeb Classical Library No. 461. Cambridge, Massachusetts, Harvard University Press, 1992. . Online version at Harvard University Press.
 Diodorus Siculus, Library of History, Volume III: Books 4.59-8, translated by C. H. Oldfather, Loeb Classical Library No. 340, Cambridge, Massachusetts, Harvard University Press, 1939. . Online version at Harvard University Press. Online version by Bill Thayer.
 Eraslan, Şehnaz, "Tethys and Thalassa in mosaic art", in Art Sanat, Vol. 4, pp. 1–13. PDF.
 Hyginus, Gaius Julius, Fabulae in Apollodorus' Library and Hyginus' Fabulae: Two Handbooks of Greek Mythology, translated, with Introductions by R. Scott Smith and Stephen M. Trzaskoma, Hackett Publishing, 2007. . Google Books.
 Hyginus, Gaius Julius, Hygini Fabulae, edited by Herbert Jennings Rose, Leiden, Sijthoff, 1934. Online version at Packhum.
 Lucian, Lucian of Samosata, from the Greek, with the Comments and Illustrations of Wieland and others, Volume I, translated by William Tooke, London, 1820. Google Books.
 Morand, Anne-France, Études sur les Hymnes Orphiques, Brill, 2001. . Online version at Brill.
 Silva, Moises, God, Language and Scripture: Reading the Bible in the light of general linguistics, Zondervan, 1990. .
 Wendel, Carl, Scholia in Apollonium Rhodium vetera, Hildesheim, Weidmann, 1999. .

External links 
 

Greek sea goddesses
Aesop's Fables
Greek primordial deities
Sea and river goddesses
Personifications in Greek mythology
Personifications